ČPP Arena, is an arena in Hradec Králové, Czech Republic. It is primarily used for ice hockey, and is the home to the Mountfield HK of the Czech Extraliga. It opened in 1957 and holds 6,890 spectators.

References

External links
 Official website 

Indoor arenas in the Czech Republic
Indoor ice hockey venues in the Czech Republic
Buildings and structures in Hradec Králové
1957 establishments in Czechoslovakia
Sports venues completed in 1957
20th-century architecture in the Czech Republic